The minister of state for Brexit opportunities and government efficiency is a ministerial office in the Cabinet Office in the Government of the United Kingdom. This position was created (as "Minister for Efficiency and Transformation") by Prime Minister Boris Johnson in February 2020 as a renaming of Minister of State for the Treasury with new responsibilities. It was a joint office with HM Treasury and the Cabinet Office from 2020 to 2022. After Jacob Rees-Mogg was appointed in February 2022, the role was made a full member of the Cabinet; he was based solely at the Cabinet Office.

Responsibilities 
Responsibilities of the post include:

Brexit Opportunities
 Spend controls  (including controls reform)
 Public bodies
 Government reform
 Procurement Bill
 Places for Growth (a team within the Cabinet Office which aims to relocate Civil Service roles away from London to the regions and nations of the UK)
 Commercial and commercial models
 Functions:- Commercial Tackling Fraud, Error and Debt; and Grants Government Property Agency Office of Government Property
 Infrastructure and Projects Authority (jointly with HMT)

Officeholders

References 

HM Treasury
Ministerial offices in the United Kingdom
Cabinet Office (United Kingdom)
Brexit